Range is an unincorporated community in Grant County, Oregon.

History
The Range post office was established on June 4, 1908, and Craig Thom was the first postmaster. It was so named due to the surrounding rangeland.

References

Unincorporated communities in Grant County, Oregon
Unincorporated communities in Oregon
1908 establishments in Oregon
Populated places established in 1908